Annie van Stiphout-van de Kerkhof (Helmond, 30 September 1952) is a former Dutch long-distance runner. She was an eight-time Dutch champion at various distances (1500 metres to marathon).

External links 
 
 

1952 births
Living people
Dutch female cross country runners
Dutch female marathon runners
Sportspeople from Helmond
20th-century Dutch women
21st-century Dutch women